The following ships of the Indian Navy have been named INS Nirghat:

Indian Navy ship names